The Sèvres Syndrome refers to a popular belief in Turkey that dangerous internal and external enemies, especially the West, are "conspiring to weaken and carve up the Turkish Republic." The term originates from the Treaty of Sèvres of the 1920s, which partitioned the Ottoman Empire among Armenia, Greece, Britain, France, and Italy, leaving a small unaffected area around Ankara under Turkish rule; however, it was never implemented since it was left unratified by the Ottoman Parliament and due to Turkish victory on all fronts during the subsequent Turkish War of Independence. Turkish historian Taner Akçam describes this attitude as an ongoing perception that "there are forces which continually seek to disperse and destroy us, and it is necessary to defend the state against this danger."

This belief is often described as a conspiracy theory, and has been likened to fostering a siege mentality among certain members of Turkish society.

Overview
Danish political scientist Dietrich Jung describes the terms as "the perception of being encircled by enemies attempting the destruction of the Turkish state," and asserts that it remains a significant determinant of Turkish foreign policy. The term has been used in the scope of the Kurdish conflict in Turkey, accession of Turkey to the European Union and the recognition of the Armenian Genocide. Historian Nick Danforth wrote in 2015 that “Sèvres has been largely forgotten in the West, but it has a potent legacy in Turkey, where it has helped fuel a form of nationalist paranoia some scholars have called the ‘Sèvres syndrome’”.

History
According to Fatma Müge Göçek, the literature of Sèvres Syndrome highlights three development stages of the "syndrome":
"the initial contemporaneous impact of the Sèvres Treaty on state and society in the form of fear and anxiety"
"negotiation during the radical Westernization of the Turkish Republic which is spearheaded by the military and the CHP; internal and external enemies are defined during this stage"
"the institutionalized syndrome becomes radicalized as ultra-nationalist parties try to systematically exclude such perceived enemies from the Turkish body politic"

Nefes reports a strong undercurrent of antisemitism, blaming the treaty on a supposed Jewish conspiracy.

Foreign policy of Turkey
In 2019, hailing Turkey's willingness to once more project power across the Mediterranean, Erdogan said “Thanks to this military and energy cooperation, we overturned the Treaty of Sèvres”. 

According to a Le Monde article, the opening date of Grand Hagia Sophia Mosque for worship was not a coincidence, as 24 July marked the 97th anniversary of the Lausanne Treaty. "In the minds of Erdogan and his far-right partners who rallied after the failed coup, it is a matter of foiling the trap of a 'new Treaty of Sevres'".

In a column responding to the Le Monde piece, İbrahim Karagül, editor-in-chief of Yeni Şafak, suggested that the Western media was not “wrong” in spotlighting the weight of Sèvres on Turkey's newly assertive foreign policy.

Comparisons
In 2015, Devlet Bahçeli, leader of the far-right Nationalist Movement Party, compared the agreement between the pro-Kurdish Peoples' Democratic Party (HDP) and the Turkish government in the scope of the Kurdish–Turkish peace process to the Treaty of Sèvres. Bahçeli claimed that the agreement "will lead to the collapse of the Turkish Republic and has vowed to resist it."

See also
 Siege mentality
 Trianon Syndrome

References

Bibliography
 Drakoularakos, Stavros. "Turkey and Erdoğan’s rising 'Lausanne Syndrome'." Digest of Middle East Studies 30.1 (2021): 22-33. doi=10.1111/dome.12224

 Guida, Michelangelo. "The Sèvres syndrome and 'Komplo' theories in the Islamist and Secular Press." Turkish Studies 9.1 (2008): 37-52. online
 Gulmez, Didem Buhari. "Foreigner Rights in Turkey: From Sèvres Syndrome to Decoupled Europeanization." in Europeanization in a Global Context (Palgrave Macmillan, London, 2017) pp. 141-166. online

 Hovsepyan, Levon. "The Fears of Turkey: the Sèvres Syndrome." Information and Public Relation Center (2012). online
 Matthews, Ryan John. "Sevres Syndrome: Constructing the populist us versus them through fear in Turkey" (PhD. Diss. Virginia Tech, 2021) online.

 Nefes, Türkay Salim. "Understanding anti-semitic rhetoric in Turkey through the sèvres syndrome." Turkish Studies 16.4 (2015): 572-587. online
 Oprea, Iulia-Alexandra. "Heritage Of Fear: The Sèvres Syndrome, Turkishness." in Dynamics and Policies of Prejudice from the Eighteenth to the Twenty-first Century (2018) pp: 143+. online
 

 Schmid, Dorothée. "Turkey: The Sèvres Syndrome, or the Interminable War." Politique etrangere 1 (2014): 199-213.
 Yılmaz, Hakan. "Euroscepticism in Turkey: Parties, elites, and public opinion." South European Society and Politics 16.01 (2011): 185-208. online

Modern history of Turkey
Conspiracy theories in Turkey